Thunderhawk: Operation Phoenix, known as Thunderstrike: Operation Phoenix in North America, is a combat flight simulation video game developed by Core Design and published by Eidos Interactive exclusively for PlayStation 2.

Reception
Thunderhawk: Operation Phoenix received mixed reviews from critics. It has an aggregate score of 71.29% on GameRankings and 65/100 on Metacritic.

References

External links
 

2001 video games
Combat flight simulators
Core Design games
Eidos Interactive games
Helicopter video games
PlayStation 2 games
PlayStation 2-only games
Video games developed in the United Kingdom